Human Kind Of is an American adult animated comedy series created by Diana McCorry that premiered on September 16, 2018, on Facebook Watch. It was Facebook Watch's first original animated series.

Premise
Human Kind Of begins when "Judy Reilly, a nerdy teenager, finds out her estranged father was an extraterrestrial" and realizes "surviving a half-alien adolescence seems pretty hopeless. But with the help of a dangerously upbeat mother and a comic book obsessed best friend, Judy is able to uncover her powers, stand up to bullies, and inevitably discover what makes her both alien and human along the way."

Cast and characters

Main
 Michelle Trachtenberg as Judy Reilly
 Kate Berlant as Cory
 Jill Talley as Iris
 Zak Orth as Mr. Russo / Ethan / Dad / Eye Patch

Recurring
 Jeremy Bent as The Man
 Jamie Loftus as Melissa
 Diana McCorry as GPS
 John Early as Callie / Mr. Jake
 Betsy Sodaro as Ms. Coward / Hungry Alien

Episodes

Production

Development
In September 2018, Facebook Media Productions, LLC filed trademark applications for the show to the United States Patent and Trademark Office. As of August 2020, Facebook Media Productions, LLC still holds the trademark for the series.

On September 14, 2018, it was announced that Facebook Watch had given the production a series order for a first season consisting of twenty-one episodes. Production companies involved with the series were slated to consist of digital media company Cartuna. Joy Buran and Noelle Melody were animation directors on the series.

Casting
Alongside the initial series announcement, it was confirmed that the series would feature the voices of Michelle Trachtenberg, Kate Berlant, Jill Talley, Zak Orth, John Early, and Betsy Sodaro.

Release
On September 17, 2018, the series premiered on Facebook Watch on the same day as Liverspots and Astronots and released three episodes each week. The season finale aired on October 28, 2018.

Reception
Encyclopedia of Science Fiction contributor Steven Pearce gave a short positive review of the show, saying that the show uses Judy's condition to "explore teenage social anxieties" at first, but this later changes, praising it for its story which relies on science fiction tropes, and humor, calling it "an interesting and amusing show." Bubble Blabber praised the series for its mature content, including supernatural themes, character designs, and animation, while questioning its episode times and the release schedule, but calling it "kind of brilliant."

Awards and nominations

References

External links

2018 American television series debuts
2018 American television series endings
2010s American animated comedy television series
2010s American adult animated television series
2010s American comic science fiction television series
2010s American high school television series
American adult animated comedy television series
American adult animated science fiction television series
American adult animated web series
English-language television shows
Facebook Watch original programming
Animated television series about extraterrestrial life
Teen animated television series
Cartuna